Ghulam Abbas is a Muslim given name or surname and may refer to:

Chaudhry Ghulam Abbas (1904–1967), lawyer and politician of Jammu and Kashmir
Ghulam Abbas (writer) (1909–1982), Pakistani short-story writer
Gulam Abbas Moontasir (born 1942), Indian basketball player
Ghulam Abbas (cricketer) (born 1947), Pakistani cricketer
Ghulam Abbas Kazmi (born 1955), Indian criminal lawyer
Ghulam Abbas (hurdler) (born 1966), Pakistani hurdler, competed for Pakistan at the 1992 Summer Olympics
Gholam-Abbas Ashoubi, also known as Farzad Ashoubi (born 1980), Iranian footballer
Ghulam Abbas (singer) (born 1955), Pakistani singer